AMSAT OSCAR 10 (or AO-10) was a star-shaped German AMSAT micro-satellite. It was launched on 16 June 1983 from Guiana Space Centre, Kourou, French Guiana, with an Ariane 1 rocket. This was changed to a Molniya orbit using an attached booster, to support world-wide amateur satellite communications.

Specifications
 COSPAR ID: 1983-058B
 SATCAT: 14129
 Launch mass: 
 Perigee: 
 Apogee: 
 Inclination: 26.6°

References

Satellites of Germany
Amateur radio satellites